Blondeau is a French surname. Notable people with the surname include:

 Auguste Blondeau (1786–1863), French violinist and composer
 Charles Bruno Blondeau (1835–1888), Canadian politician and contractor
 Gustav Blondeau (1871–1965), co-founder of early aircraft manufacturer Hewlett & Blondeau
 Jean-Yves Blondeau (born 1970), inventor the 32-wheel roller suit
 Patrick Blondeau (born 1968), international footballer
 Peter Blondeau (died 1672), French moneyer and engineer
 Thérèse Blondeau (1913–2013), French swimmer
 Thomas Blondeau (1978–2013), Belgian writer and journalist
 Thylane Blondeau (born 2001), French model and actress

See also 
 Blondeau River (disambiguation)
 Blondel (disambiguation)

French-language surnames